Robert Taylor Nesbitt (1843 – February 13, 1913) served as a Georgia State Senator from Cobb County as well as Georgia Commissioner of Agriculture from 1890–1900.

Biography
Nesbitt was born in Savannah, Georgia, in 1843 to Martha Deloney Berrien Nesbitt Duncan (1820–1896) and Hugh O'Keefe Nesbitt, who were married in 1839. The wedding took place in the Athens, Georgia, home of Martha's Berrian's stepfather, Robert Taylor Grady, a Greek Revival mansion known as the Taylor-Grady Home and now designated as a National Historic Landmark.

In 1865, after four years of service in the Confederate Army, Colonel Nesbitt married Rebecca Lanier Saffold (1845–1937), daughter of Colonel W.O. Saffold, in Madison, Georgia. The Nesbitts eventually settled near Marietta, Georgia, at an estate called Farm Hill, where Robert Nesbitt continued to manage his landholdings in southern Georgia.

Robert Nesbitt wrote a newspaper column, "Mr. Nesbitt's Monthly Talk," for the Marietta Journal, focused on agricultural issues.

In 1886, Robert and Rebecca Nesbitt deeded one acre of land, about three miles outside the city of Marietta, Georgia, for the creation of Union Chapel, to "be used as a place of worship for all Christian denominations, for skools [sic] and agricultural societies and for no other purposes." Along with John R. Ward, James G. Hughes, Robert C. Irwin, and Hugh N. Starnes, Robert Nesbitt served as a trustee for Union Chapel, a stone gothic revival chapel that served as a community gathering place,  school, and place of worship for several Christian denominations.

Robert Taylor Nesbitt died at his home on February 13, 1913, and is buried in the St. James Episcopal Cemetery in Marietta, Georgia.

References

External links
 

1843 births
1913 deaths
Georgia (U.S. state) state senators
People from Cobb County, Georgia
Politicians from Savannah, Georgia
Confederate States Army soldiers